Quinak may refer to:
 Qeshlaq-e Quinak
 Quinak-e Rakhshani
 Quinak-e Zohari